

Permanent Lease to Permanent Grant 
A 999-year lease, under historic Common Law, is a Permanent Lease of property. Permanent Lease locations are in Britain, its former colonies and the Commonwealth. A former colony, the Republic of Mauritius (The Raphael Fishing Company Ltd v. The State of Mauritius & Anor (Mauritius) [2008] UKPC 43 (30 July 2008)) established legal precedent on 30 July 2008 in respect of a 1901 'permanent lease' on the following Thirteen Islands of St. Brandon (Cargados Carajos) :

These Thirteen Islands of St. Brandon (Cargados Carajos), Mauritius, were converted from a 1901 Permanent Lease (999-year lease) to a Permanent Grant by the Privy Council (United Kingdom) in 2008. The Privy Council (United Kingdom) judgment (Article 71) confirmed Raphaël Fishing Company legally as ''the holder of a Permanent Grant of the thirteen islands mentioned in the 1901 Deed (transcribed in Vol TB25 No 342) subject to the conditions therein referred to'

See also 
 UK Privy Council
Raphaël Fishing Company
 99-year lease
 999-year leases in Hong Kong
 Constitution of Mauritius
 St. Brandon

References

External links

Map of Mauritius

Real property law
Common law
Contract law
 
Outer Islands of Mauritius
Reefs of the Indian Ocean
Insular ecology
Atolls of the Indian Ocean
Privy Council of the United Kingdom
Constitution of Mauritius